Vojtěch Jarník (1897–1970) was a Czech mathematician who worked for many years as a professor and administrator at Charles University, and helped found the  Czechoslovak Academy of Sciences. He is the namesake of Jarník's algorithm for minimum spanning trees.

Jarník worked in number theory, mathematical analysis, and graph algorithms. He has been called "probably the first Czechoslovak mathematician whose scientific works received wide and lasting international response". As well as developing Jarník's algorithm, he found tight bounds on the number of lattice points on convex curves, studied the relationship between the Hausdorff dimension of sets of real numbers and how well they can be approximated by rational numbers, and investigated the properties of nowhere-differentiable functions.

Education and career
Jarník was born December 22, 1897. Despite this background, Jarník learned no Latin at his gymnasium (the C.K. české vyšší reálné gymnasium, Ječná, Prague), so when he entered Charles University in 1915 he had to do so as an extraordinary student until he could pass a Latin examination three semesters later.

He studied mathematics and physics at Charles University from 1915 to 1919, with Karel Petr as a mentor. After completing his studies, he became an assistant to Jan Vojtěch at the  Brno University of Technology, where he also met Mathias Lerch. In 1921 he completed a doctoral degree (RNDr.) at Charles University with a dissertation on Bessel functions supervised by Petr, then returned to Charles University as Petr's assistant.

While keeping his position at Charles University, he studied with Edmund Landau at the University of Göttingen from 1923 to 1925 and again from 1927 to 1929. On his first return to Charles University he defended his habilitation, and on his return from the second visit, he was given a chair in mathematics as an extraordinary professor. He was promoted to full professor in 1935 and later served as Dean of Sciences (1947–1948) and Vice-Rector (1950–1953).
He retired in 1968.

Jarník supervised the dissertations of 16 doctoral students.
Notable among these are Miroslav Katětov, a chess master who became rector of Charles University, Jaroslav Kurzweil, known for the Henstock–Kurzweil integral,
and Slovak mathematician Tibor Šalát.

He died September 22, 1970.

Contributions
Although Jarník's 1921 dissertation, like some of his later publications, was in mathematical analysis, his main area of work was in number theory. He studied the Gauss circle problem and proved a number of results on Diophantine approximation, lattice point problems, and the geometry of numbers. He also made pioneering, but long-neglected, contributions to combinatorial optimization.

Number theory

The Gauss circle problem asks for the number of points of the integer lattice enclosed by a given circle.
One of Jarník's theorems (1926), related to this problem, is that any closed strictly convex curve with length  passes through
at most

points of the integer lattice. The  in this formula is an instance of Big O notation. Neither the exponent of  nor the leading constant of this bound can be improved, as there exist convex curves with this many grid points.

Another theorem of Jarník in this area shows that, for any closed convex curve in the plane with a well-defined length, the absolute difference between the area it encloses and the number of integer points it encloses is at most its length.

Jarník also published several results in Diophantine approximation, the study of the approximation of real numbers by rational numbers.
He proved (1928–1929) that the badly approximable real numbers (the ones with bounded terms in their continued fractions) have Hausdorff dimension one. This is the same dimension as the set of all real numbers, intuitively suggesting that the set of badly approximable numbers is large. He also considered the numbers 
for which there exist infinitely many good rational approximations , with

for a given exponent , and proved (1929) that these have the smaller Hausdorff dimension . The second of these results was later rediscovered by Besicovitch. Besicovitch used different methods than Jarník to prove it, and the result has come to be known as the Jarník–Besicovitch theorem.

Mathematical analysis
Jarník's work in real analysis was sparked by finding, in the unpublished works of Bernard Bolzano, a definition of a continuous function that was nowhere differentiable. Bolzano's 1830 discovery predated the 1872 publication of the Weierstrass function, previously considered to be the first example of such a function. Based on his study of Bolzano's function, Jarník was led to a more general theorem: If a real-valued function of a closed interval does not have bounded variation in any subinterval, then there is a dense subset of its domain on which at least one of its Dini derivatives is infinite. This applies in particular to the nowhere-differentiable functions, as they must have unbounded variation in all intervals. Later, after learning of a result by Stefan Banach and Stefan Mazurkiewicz that generic functions (that is, the members of a residual set of functions) are nowhere differentiable, Jarník proved that at almost all points, all four Dini derivatives of such a function are infinite. Much of his later work in this area concerned extensions of these results to approximate derivatives.

Combinatorial optimization

In computer science and combinatorial optimization, Jarník is known for an algorithm for constructing minimum spanning trees that he published in 1930, in response to the publication of Borůvka's algorithm by another Czech mathematician, Otakar Borůvka. Jarník's algorithm builds a tree from a single starting vertex of a given weighted graph by repeatedly adding the cheapest connection to any other vertex, until all vertices have been connected.
The same algorithm was later rediscovered in the late 1950s by Robert C. Prim and Edsger W. Dijkstra. It is also known as Prim's algorithm or the Prim–Dijkstra algorithm.

In this problem, one must again form a tree connecting a given set of points, with edge costs given by the Euclidean distance. However, additional points that are not part of the input may be added to make the overall tree shorter. This paper is the first serious treatment of the general Steiner tree problem (although it appears earlier in a letter by  Gauss), and it already contains "virtually all general properties of Steiner trees" later attributed to other researchers.

Recognition and legacy
Jarník was a member of the Czech Academy of Sciences and Arts, from 1934 as an extraordinary member and from 1946 as a regular member. In 1952 he became one of the founding members of  Czechoslovak Academy of Sciences. He was also awarded the Czechoslovak State Prize in 1952.

The Vojtěch Jarník International Mathematical Competition, held each year since 1991 in Ostrava, is named in his honor, as is Jarníkova Street in the Chodov district of Prague. A series of postage stamps published by Czechoslovakia in 1987 to honor the 125th anniversary of the Union of Czechoslovak mathematicians and physicists included one stamp featuring Jarník together with Joseph Petzval and Vincenc Strouhal.

A conference was held in Prague, in March 1998, to honor the centennial of his birth.

Since 2002, ceremonial Jarník's lecture is held every year at Faculty of Mathematics and Physics, Charles University, in a lecture hall named after him.

Selected publications
Jarník published 90 papers in mathematics, including:
. A function with unbounded variation in all intervals has a dense set of points where a Dini derivative is infinite.
. Tight bounds on the number of integer points on a convex curve, as a function of its length.
. The badly-approximable numbers have Hausdorff dimension one.
. The well-approximable numbers have Hausdorff dimension less than one.
. The original reference for Jarnik's algorithm for minimum spanning trees.
. Generic functions have infinite Dini derivatives at almost all points.
. The first serious treatment of the Steiner tree problem.

He was also the author of ten textbooks in Czech, on integral calculus, differential equations, and mathematical analysis. These books "became classics for several generations of students".

References

Further reading
.

External links
 

1897 births
1970 deaths
Czechoslovak mathematicians
Academic staff of Charles University
Charles University alumni